A diurnal cycle (or diel cycle) is any pattern that recurs every 24 hours as a result of one full rotation of the planet Earth around its axis. Earth's rotation causes surface temperature fluctuations throughout the day and night, as well as weather changes throughout the year. The diurnal cycle depends mainly on incoming solar radiation.

Climate and atmosphere 

In climatology, the diurnal cycle is one of the most basic forms of climate patterns, including variations in diurnal temperature and rainfall. Diurnal cycles may be approximately sinusoidal or include components of a truncated sinusoid (due to the Sun's rising and setting) and thermal relaxation (Newton cooling) at night. The diurnal cycle also has a great impact on carbon dioxide levels in the atmosphere, due to processes such as photosynthesis and cellular respiration.

Biological effects 
Diurnal cycles of light and temperature can result in similar cycles in biological processes, such as photosynthesis in plants and clinical depression in humans. Plant responses to environmental cycles may even induce indirect cycles in rhizosphere microbial activities, including nitrogen fixation.

Semi-diurnal cycle 
A semi-diurnal cycle refers to a pattern that occurs about every twelve hours or about twice a day. Often these can be related to lunar tides, in which case the interval is closer to 12 hours and 25 minutes.

See also
Chronotype
Circadian rhythm
Diel vertical migration
Diurnality

References

Climate patterns
Day